Ozerki is a station on line 2 of the Saint Petersburg Metro, within the Ozerki historic district. It opened on 19 August 1988, and is between Udelnaya and Prospekt Prosvescheniya stations.

The underground hall is decorated with marble, granite and diabase in warm orange tones, and  mosaic pictures on the theme of nature. Three escalators are at the northern end of the station.

Gallery

Saint Petersburg Metro stations
Railway stations in Russia opened in 1988
1988 establishments in the Soviet Union
Railway stations located underground in Russia